Francis Patrick Quinlan (March 9, 1869 – May 4, 1904) was a Major League Baseball player who played for one season. He played two games for the Boston Reds for two games on October 5, 1891 during the Reds' American Association championship. During the doubleheader, he played one game as a catcher and another game as a left fielder.

External links

1869 births
1904 deaths
Major League Baseball catchers
Major League Baseball left fielders
Baseball players from Massachusetts
Boston Reds (AA) players
19th-century baseball players
Pawtucket (minor league baseball) players
Haverhill (minor league baseball) players
Lewiston (minor league baseball) players
Cambridge Orphans players
Lowell Orphans players